Pandeshwara Kalinga Rao (1914 – 21 September 1981) was an Indian Bhavageete and Sugama Sangeetha singer and composer in the Kannada language.

Biography
Kalinga Rao was married to Meenakshamma (d. 2015). The had four children together: Prema, Vasanth, Sharath and Santosh. Rao was a primary school drop-out. But his knowledge of six languages was near scholarly.

Pioneer of light music
He popularised the Kannada Bhavageete, a form of music that derives lyrics from popular poetry and devotional works.

Rao is widely regarded as the pioneer of the Kannada sugama sangeeta genre. He was active for three decades from 1950 and thankfully almost all of his tunes were recorded either by the gramophone companies or All India Radio. Kalinga Rao began his musical life in the era of the 78 rpm gramophone record, and the three-minute discs took his music to audiences all over Karnataka. He was also a rage on radio, and started a musical counter culture that could take on expensively produced film songs.

Poets Kuvempu, Bendre, and K S Narasimha Swamy were writing inspired lyrics that would soon turn into classics, and Kalinga Rao was instrumental in composing tunes for them. He also sang Purandaradasa and folk songs, emerging as a complete practitioner of Kannada music. Kalinga Rao used the medium of music more as a promoter of poems of great Kannada poets such as Kuvempu, D. R. Bendre and Gopalakrishna Adiga than as a performer unlike professional musicians. It was not the music, but the words of these poets which sought importance in his compositions.

Distinctive composition
Kalinga Rao had learnt Carnatic and Hindustani classical music, but chose to experiment and arrive at a style that struck a balance between classical music and film music. Aesthetically, the genre he created drew from both worlds: raga nuances from the former, and the freedom to break from raga grammar from the latter. He also brought in Western orchestra colour, just like the movie composers, but was sparing in their use. Kalinga Rao mastered a mellow, understated, and chorus-easy style.
He was the Chief Composer at the Gubbi Veeranna Drama Company. He acted and composed the music for Kannada cinema "Vasantha Sena".

Influence
Kalinga Rao's composer-singer tradition was carried forward by Mysore Ananthaswamy, C. Ashwath and Shivamogga Subbanna, and grew into a movement in the 1990s, giving rise to annual conferences and schools teaching sugama sangeeta. Mysore Ananthaswamy leaned towards the filigree of the ghazal style and excelled at tweaking Western styles for Kannada songs. C. Ashwath evolved a style that dramatised a folksy style. His signature composition Udayavagali Namma Cheluva Kannada Nadu which inspired the Kannada unification movement was a landmark in the Kannada light music tradition.

Commemoration
A compilation of his works was released in the form of a CD titled Barayya Beladingale in 2010 with the help of some Government officials and talented artistes like D Srinivas, Rajesh, Suma Rani, Nelson, Venu, Arun Kumar, Varadaraj, Caleb and V Umesh. Kalinga Rao's original recordings used a piano, strings, clarinet, trumpets, and a tight rhythm section which often incorporates folk sounds. The magic of his music isn't completely lost in the digital format, although listeners who have heard him on spool and vinyl records may miss the warmth of his era.

Department of Kannada and Culture organised a programme to mark the birth centenary of P Kalinga at Ravindra Kalakshetra on 6 September 2014. The Chief Minister of the state of Karnataka Siddaramaiah inaugurated the day-long event. A photo exhibition was organised to introduce the legendary singer to the present generation. Beladingala Hakki, a 240-page book on Kalinga Rao, a CD on his recordings of Rangageethegalu (theatre songs), and the radio play for which he composed music was released on the occasion.

A Kannada monograph P Kalinga Rao, edited by B S Keshava Rao and Jayashri Aravind and published by 
the Kannada and Culture department, brings to light many interesting events from his life, including one where a government official demands certificates of his music qualifications for the grant of an artist pension. Kalinga Rao angrily rejects the pension, but chief minister Devaraj Urs steps in to help him in his needy days.

Popular songs

List of some of his popular songs.

Death
Kalinga Rao died on 21 September 1981.

References

1914 births
1981 deaths
Musicians from Karnataka
Kannada film score composers
People from Udupi district
20th-century Indian singers
Indian male composers
20th-century Indian composers
Film musicians from Karnataka
Kannada playback singers
Indian male playback singers
Male film score composers
20th-century Indian male singers